Johnson Chang (Cantonese: Chang Tsong-zung) is a curator and dealer of contemporary Chinese art. He is a co-founder of the Asia Art Archive (AAA) in Hong Kong and a guest professor of the China Academy of Art in Hangzhou.

Background 
Chang Tsong-zung was born in 1960 in Hong Kong. He graduated from Williams College in 1973.
He has been curating art exhibitions since the 1980s. 
He founded Hanart TZ gallery in Hong Kong in 1983. It is now one of the city's most established.

He was a pioneer in introducing contemporary Chinese art to international exhibitions in the 1990s.

It was through his gallery that he organized exhibitions of the Taiwanese sculptor Ju Ming at the Singapore Art Museum in 1986 and Place Vendôme in Paris in 1997. It was also with Hanart that he staged "China’s New Art Post-1989," which debuted at the 1993 Hong Kong Arts Festival and then toured the United States from 1995 to 1997.

In Shanghai in late 2010, Chang organized "West Heavens," a contemporary art collaboration between China and India.

In their annual "The Power 100" listing, Art Review named Chang, alongside Claire Hsu, for their co-founding of the AAA.

Personal 
Chang is known for wearing old-fashioned Chinese-styled outfits with Mandarin collars.

He was a friend of the late Sir David Tang, founder of Shanghai Tang. Chang helped Tang put together The China Club's famed art collection.

Chang is also part of Hong Kong's elite social scene and is listed in Asia Tatler's "Top List."

He has two sons.

Shows and Projects
 "China’s New Art Post-1989" (1993)
 Special Exhibitions at the São Paulo International Biennial (1994 and 1996)
 Hong Kong participation at São Paulo Biennial (1996)
 The Venice Biennial (2001)
 "Power of the Word" series of exhibitions
 "Strange Heaven: Chinese Contemporary Photography"
 "Open Asia International Sculpture Exhibition" in Venice (2005)
 "Yellow Box" series, Guangzhou Triennial (2008).

References 

1951 births
Living people
Chinese art historians
Chinese curators
20th-century Hong Kong historians
21st-century Hong Kong historians